Porto de Mós is a town and a municipality of Estremadura province in Leiria District. It is in the Centro Region and the Pinhal Litoral subregion. The population in 2011 was 24,342, in an area of 261.83 km².

There were archeologic findings which link São Jorge, in the parish of Calvaria de Cima, as the exact place where the Battle of Aljubarrota was fought, crucial for maintaining the independence of Portugal in 1385. Currently, there is an interpretation center on the spot (Centre of Interpretation of the Battle of Aljubarrota) which helps visitors explore the battlefield and learn about the most important facts of this battle.

In this municipality, you can also find several caves carved in the mountains, the most important being Moinhos Velhos Cave, also known as Mira de Aire Cave.

A portion of the Serras de Aire e Candeeiros Natural Park is also located in Porto de Mós municipality.

St. John

Parishes
Administratively, the municipality is divided into 10 civil parishes (freguesias):
 Alqueidão da Serra
 Alvados e Alcaria
 Arrimal e Mendiga
 Calvaria de Cima
 Juncal
 Mira de Aire
 Pedreiras
 Porto de Mós - São João Baptista e São Pedro
 São Bento
 Serro Ventoso

Notable people 
 Ruth Garcês (1934–2006 in Porto de Mós) a Portuguese lawyer, magistrate and judge. She was the first female magistrate and the first female judge in Portugal.
 Olga Silvestre (1964–    ) is a Portuguese lawyer and a deputy in the Assembly of the Republic representing the Leiria constituency,

Gallery

References

Populated places in Leiria District
Municipalities of Leiria District
Towns in Portugal